New York State Route199 (NY199) is a  state highway located in the Hudson Valley of the U.S. state of New York. Its western end is in Ulster County, where it begins as the continuation of the short U.S. Route 209 expressway east of its interchange with U.S. Route 9W; after crossing the Kingston–Rhinecliff Bridge over the Hudson River the rest of the highway crosses northern Dutchess County. As it does it passes through downtown Red Hook and Pine Plains, reaching its eastern end at U.S. Route 44 and State Route 22 southwest of Millerton in the upper Harlem Valley.

The portion of Route 199 east of its junction with the Taconic State Parkway was originally part of the Ulster and Delaware Turnpike, a toll road linking Bainbridge to Salisbury, Connecticut. This segment of the turnpike was incorporated into New York State Route41, a new route connecting Barrytown to Millerton, in the mid-1920s. NY41 was renumbered to 199 as part of the 1930 renumbering of state highways in New York.

When the Kingston–Rhinecliff Bridge opened in 1957, NY199 was realigned to continue across the bridge to the town of Ulster. The former routing of the highway between Barrytown and NY 9G along Barrytown Road remained state maintained until 1980, when ownership and maintenance of the highway was transferred to Dutchess County. It is now designated as County Route82 (CR82).

Route description

Route 9W to Red Hook

The western terminus of Route 199 is the northern terminus of U.S. Route 209 in Ulster County. When the expressway section of the latter road reaches the cloverleaf interchange with US 9W, in the town of Ulster, between Kingston and Lake Katrine, it assumes the 199 designation as it continues eastward through woodlands. Veering slightly northward, it has another interchange with State Route 32 after a mile (1.6km), with the eastbound lanes reaching the toll gantry for the Kingston–Rhinecliff Bridge  further on.

West of the toll gantry, the expressway ends as the road narrows to two lanes to cross the  bridge, on an east-southeast heading. On the east bank, now in the Dutchess County town of Rhinebeck, it remains two lanes as it traverses wooded areas, part of the Hudson River Historic District, a National Historic Landmark. The road returns to a due-east course shortly after the crossing; it has its first traffic light at the intersection with River Road (also County Route 103).

At  past that intersection, the highway reaches another traffic light at State Route 9G. It joins that highway northbound, immediately entering the town of Red Hook, for a two-mile (3.2km) stretch through woodlands, first heading northwest then due north. The two lanes widen to four on either side of the Rokeby Road intersection.

The 9G concurrency ends a mile to the north, where the roadway reaches another traffic light after a bend northeast. Here NY 199 turns east, going over a slight rise and then trending slightly southward towards the village of Red Hook. At the village line, a mile east of NY 9G, it passes Red Hook High School, the historic Maizefield estate, and the middle school, becoming West Market Street. At the center of town, another traffic light marks the intersection with U.S. Route 9.

Red Hook to Pine Plains

NY 199 becomes East Market Street and leaves the village approximately a half-mile (800m) to the east, curving gently through a mix of fields and woodlots in the surrounding landscape. A mile (1.6km) past the village, the road makes the first of four crossings of the Saw Kill. After crossing the Lakes Kill a thousand feet (300m) further on, the road starts a long turn southeastward past the former Sky Park Airport and Red Hook Golf Club.

The Saw Kill crosses again just north of the end of this section, at the small hamlet of Rock City, where the towns of Red Hook, Rhinebeck and Milan meet. State Route 308 has its eastern terminus here, and a signal over the third crossing of the Saw Kill regulates traffic as NY 199 makes the abrupt turn eastward again. A sculpture of an oversized fork marks this "fork in the road". The road and the Saw Kill parallel each other for another mile of rural landscape before the stream makes its final and uppermost crossing just past the Milan Hill Road (County Route 54) intersection on the north side.

Past this point the highway bends southeast again, crossing Little Wappingers Creek, as the landscape becomes hillier and more wooded. A mile and a half further it resumes heading east, past Milan's town hall, to its interchange with the Taconic State Parkway, climbing slightly. East of the Taconic NY 199 crosses the small hamlet of Lafayetteville, turning to the north as it descends for a mile through a narrow, wooded valley to Wilbur Pond and Lafayetteville Multiple Use Area.

For the next two miles NY 199 continues to descend, turning northeast and entering the town of Pine Plains midway. After crossing Ham Brook, the highway turns north northeast for three-quarters of a mile (1.1km), bending back to the southeast around the side of an unnamed hill. The road returns to an east southeast heading as it descends another mile and the hills abruptly give way to more level ground on the outskirts of central Pine Plains, where NY 199 passes Stissing Mountain High School and becomes West Church Street, still trending south.

Pine Plains to Harlem Valley

At the junction with Main Street in the center of town, the first traffic light since Rock City also marks where State Route 82 comes in from the south. It forms NY 199's other concurrency when it joins the highway heading eastbound. The joined roads continue together east southeast back into the countryside for the next mile and a half. Just past Pine Plains' town hall, at Hammertown, NY 82 turns north, towards the Columbia County hamlet of Ancram, ending the concurrency.

From this intersection NY 199 turns northeast again briefly, then east, into a landscape of rolling hills, farms and woodlots. Three miles (5 km) of long curves in a generally eastward direction, climbing slightly, it reaches another small hamlet, Pulvers Corners, at an intersection with County Route 59. East of there, the road drops briefly into a swampy area, then climbs again as it turns southeast. At the North East town line, it reaches 1,000 feet (305m) above sea level, the highest elevation along its route.

History

Origins and designation
On April 2, 1802, the New York State Legislature created a turnpike corporation for the purpose of building a road—the Ulster and Delaware Turnpike—from the Susquehanna River in the vicinity of the town of Jericho (now Bainbridge) to the Connecticut state line at Salisbury. The portion of the Ulster and Delaware Turnpike east of the Hudson River was also commonly known as the "Ulster and Salisbury Turnpike" or just the "Salisbury Turnpike". The turnpike crossed the Hudson River from Kingston to Rhinecliff by way of the Kingston–Rhinecliff Ferry and used modern Rhinecliff Road and West Market Street to reach the village of Rhinebeck. East of Rhinebeck, the turnpike passed through the hamlets of Eighmyville, Milan, Lafayetteville, and Pine Plains and the village of Millerton on its way to the Connecticut border. The turnpike corporation operated through the late 19th century.

The designation lasted for only half a decade as NY 41 was renumbered to NY 199 as part of the 1930 renumbering of state highways in New York.

Kingston–Rhinecliff Bridge
Initial plans for the Kingston–Rhinecliff Bridge, a structure that replaced the ferry between the two locations, called for the bridge to span the Hudson River between downtown Kingston (at Kingston Point) and the village of Rhinebeck along a corridor similar to that of then-NY 308. The partially completed bridge opened to traffic on February 2, 1957, as a realignment and extension of NY 199. The route left its original alignment east of Barrytown and followed NY 9G southward to the eastern bridge approach in the town of Rhinebeck. From there, NY 199 crossed the new bridge and ended at a junction with NY 32 just west of the Hudson River, then the western endpoint of the Kingston bridge approach. An extension of NY 199 west to US 9W was completed in the late 1950s; in 1964 the completion of the Catskill Expressway portion of U.S. Route 209 allowed more direct access from Route 199 and the bridge to the New York State Thruway.

The original routing of NY 199 from the Hudson River at Barrytown to NY 9G remained state-maintained as a reference route for just over two decades. On April 1, 1980, ownership and maintenance of the highway, named Barrytown Road, was transferred from the state of New York to Dutchess County as part of a highway maintenance swap between the two levels of government. Barrytown Road is now designated as CR 82.

Major intersections

See also

List of county routes in Dutchess County, New York
New York State Bicycle Route 199

References

External links

Kingston–Rhinecliff Bridge @ NYCROADS.com
Unbuilt Catskill Expressway @ NYCROADS.com

199
Transportation in Ulster County, New York
Transportation in Dutchess County, New York
Limited-access roads in New York (state)